Millet/Creekview Aerodrome  is located  southeast of Millet, Alberta, Canada.

References

Registered aerodromes in Alberta